Pan Shih-wei (born 27 July 1955) is a Taiwanese politician. He was the Minister of the Council of Labor Affairs from 28 September 2012 and subsequently the Minister of Labor from 17 February 2014 until his resignation on 24 July 2014.

Education
Pan obtained his bachelor's degree in political science from Tunghai University and master's degree in labor studies from Chinese Culture University. He continued his graduate study in the United States, obtaining master's and doctoral degrees in industrial and labor relations from Cornell University.

Political career
During the 2008 ROC Presidential Election, Pan wrote the labor policy for Ma Ying-jeou and Vincent Siew ticket of the Kuomintang.

Council of Labor Affairs Ministry

Ministry appointment
Pan was appointed to be the Minister of CLA after the incumbent Minister Wang Ju-hsuan resigned amid an uproar over her proposal to raise the minimum wage in Taiwan.

Taiwan new pension reform
In mid April 2013, Pan announced new pension reforms for Taiwan due to the projected Labor Insurance Funds bankruptcy in 2027. He added that the ROC government had launched a series reform methods to sustain the fund for at least another 30 years. He warned that this change would be painful.

References

Taiwanese Ministers of Labor
Living people
Cornell University alumni
Academic staff of the Chinese Culture University
Tunghai University alumni
Taiwanese educators
1955 births